Ahi Bir al-Maksur F.C. ('), is an Israeli football club based in Bir al-Maksur. The club is currently in Liga Bet North A division.

History
The club was founded in 2010 and joined Liga Gimel Jezreel division, where it played for three seasons, improving from finishing 13th in 2010–11 to 4th in 2012–13. In 2013 the club was moved to the Lower Galilee division, where the club finished 2nd in 2014–15 and was promoted to Liga Bet.

External links
Ahi Bir al-Maksur Israel Football Association

References

Football clubs in Israel
Association football clubs established in 2010
2010 establishments in Israel